Yanggakdo Stadium is a multi-purpose stadium located on Yanggak Island in Pyongyang, North Korea.  It is currently used mostly for football matches.  The stadium holds 30,000 people and was opened on 18 May 1989. 

In addition to the main football pitch and athletics track, there are indoor training areas for bodybuilding, weightlifting, table tennis, boxing, wrestling, judo, and swimming. There are also dedicated spaces for football referees, changing rooms for players, a broadcasting room, correspondents' and commentator's rooms, and medical facilities. As well as the main pitch, there are three training pitches for football, and eight tennis courts.

References

See also 
 List of football stadiums in North Korea

Sports venues completed in 1989
Football venues in North Korea
Sports venues in Pyongyang
Multi-purpose stadiums in North Korea
Event venues established in 1989
1989 establishments in North Korea
20th-century architecture in North Korea